"The Odyssey of Flight 33" is episode 54 of the American television anthology series The Twilight Zone, the 18th episode of the second season. An unlikely break of the time barrier finds a commercial airliner sent back into the prehistoric age and then to New York City of 1939. The tale is a modern telling of the Flying Dutchman myth, and was written by series creator Rod Serling. It originally aired on February 24, 1961 on CBS.

Opening narration

Plot

Global Airlines Flight 33 is en route from London to New York City. About 50 minutes from Idlewild Airport, Captain Farver and his crew notice that the ground speed of their Boeing 707 is rapidly increasing beyond all reason. Their true airspeed remains constant, so there is no risk of the plane breaking up. They can no longer contact anyone by radio.

The plane travels through a flash of light and severe turbulence; the captain wonders if they have gone through the sound barrier. There is no apparent damage to the aircraft. Still unable to contact anyone on the ground, and at the risk of potential collision with other aircraft, Farver finally decides to descend below the clouds. The crew is able to identify the coastline of Manhattan Island and other geographic landmarks, but there is no city. The crew realizes that they have traveled far back in time when they see grazing dinosaurs.

Their only hope of returning to the present day is to increase altitude and speed in an attempt to catch the same 'jet stream'. After another flash of light and violent shaking, New York City is once again visible, and although they still cannot contact Idlewild, they are able to reach LaGuardia Airport. However, the air traffic controller on the radio does not understand their technological references. The controller eventually clears the aircraft to land at LaGuardia, but orders the captain to report to the CAA office afterward; the captain remarks that they haven't called the Federal Aviation Administration by that name in years. The copilot spots the buildings and structures from the New York World's Fair of 1939 below.

The captain briefly considers using LaGuardia to refuel before making another attempt to return to 1961, but he rejects the plan because LaGuardia's runway is too short to handle a Boeing 707. As he attempts one more ascent before the fuel runs out, he addresses the passengers, explaining that they have traveled back in time. "All I ask of you is that you remain calm," he tells the passengers over the P.A. system, "...and pray."

Closing narration

Production notes

Serling originally developed the idea for the show when he learned that American Airlines had a mockup of a 707 interior, previously used for flight attendant training, that they would make available to TV or film production companies.

Serling's brother, aviation writer Robert J. Serling, helped Serling with the cockpit dialogue for the show by discussing the show's premise with a Trans World Airlines captain; after the show aired, several pilots later wrote to say that they thought the cockpit dialogue was among the most authentic ever in a television show.

The Brontosaurus model and miniature jungle set from the 1960 film Dinosaurus! were used for the stop motion animation.

LaGuardia Airport, although it had opened in October 1939 (and thus was open during the second half of the 1939–40 World's Fair held in New York), was not officially named after Mayor Fiorello H. La Guardia until 1947; up to that point, its official name was New York Municipal Airport. However, the nickname "LaGuardia Field" was in common use two weeks after the airport opened.

Graphic novel
This episode was one of several Twilight Zone stories adapted as a graphic novel. The adaptation expands upon the television episode, including a subplot involving several passengers and flight crew, as well as updating the story to 1973. It also adds a time jump to the future.

See also
 List of The Twilight Zone (1959 TV series) episodes
The Langoliers
Manifest
Twilight Zone literature § Comics

References

DeVoe, Bill. (2008). Trivia from The Twilight Zone. Albany, GA: Bear Manor Media. 
Grams, Martin. (2008). The Twilight Zone: Unlocking the Door to a Television Classic. Churchville, MD: OTR Publishing.

External links
 

1961 American television episodes
The Twilight Zone (1959 TV series season 2) episodes
Television episodes about dinosaurs
Television episodes about time travel
Television episodes set in New York City
Television episodes set in prehistory
Fiction set in 1939
Fiction set in 1961
Television episodes written by Rod Serling